The 2019 ISU World Team Trophy is an international figure skating competition that was held from April 11–14, 2019 in Fukuoka, Japan. The top six International Skating Union members were invited to compete in a team format with points awarded based on skaters' placement. Participating countries selected two men's single skaters, two ladies' single skaters, one pair, and one ice dance entry for their team.

Records 

The following new ISU best scores were set during this competition:

Scoring 
Skaters competed in both the short program/rhythm dance and the free skating/free dance segments for their team. Each segment was scored separately. The points earned per placement are as follows:

Tie-breaking within a segment:
 If two or more skaters, pairs, or ice dance couples have the same rank in a segment, then the total technical score will be used to break ties.
If these results do not break the tie, the competitors concerned will be considered tied. The team points will be awarded according to the placement of the skaters/couples in each discipline.

Tie-breaking within team standings:
 The highest total team points from the two best places in different disciplines of the current phase will break the ties.
 If they remain tied, the highest total segment scores of the two best places according to the team points in different disciplines of the current phase will break the ties.
 If they remain tied, the highest total team points from the three best places in different disciplines of the current phase will break the ties.
 If they remain tied, the highest total segment scores of the three best places according to the team points in different disciplines of the current phase will break the ties.
If these criteria fail to break the ties, the teams will be considered as tied.

Entries 
Names with an asterisk (*) denote the team captain.

Changes to preliminary assignments

Results

Team standings

Men

Ladies

Pairs

Ice dancing

Medalists

References 

ISU World Team Trophy
ISU World Team Trophy
International figure skating competitions hosted by Japan
ISU World Team Trophy
Sports competitions in Fukuoka